Stefan Kozlov was the defending champion but lost in the first round to Prajnesh Gunneswaran.

Ben Shelton won the title after defeating Aleksandar Vukic 0–6, 6–3, 6–2 in the final.

Seeds

Draw

Finals

Top half

Bottom half

References

External links
Main draw
Qualifying draw

Champaign-Urbana Challenger - 1
2022 Singles